Hyland may refer to:

 Hyland (band), an American Christian rock band
 Hyland Airport, in Yukon, Canada
 Hyland Bay and Moyle Floodplain, Northern Territory of Australia
 Hyland Software, an enterprise content management software provider

People with the surname
Angus Hyland (born 1963), British designer and art director
Bernard Hyland (born 1937), Australian botanist
Brian Hyland (born 1943), American musician
Davy Hyland (born 1955), Northern Irish politician
Diana Hyland (1936–1977), American actress
Drew Hyland (born 1939), American academic and philosopher
Frances Hyland (1927–2004), Canadian actress
Grace Hyland, Australian social media influencer
Greg Hyland, author of the comic strip Lethargic Lad
Hank Nelson (Hank) (1937–2012), Australian historian of the Pacific
Harry Hyland (1889–1969), Canadian ice hockey player
Herbert Hyland (1884–1970), Australian politician
Jeffrey Hyland, American businessman
Ken Hyland (born 1951), British applied linguist
Khaleem Hyland (born 1989), Trinidad and Tobago footballer
Lawrence A. Hyland (1897–1989), American radar engineer and executive of Hughes Aircraft
Lennart Hyland (1919–1993), Swedish journalist and radio and television icon
M. J. Hyland (born 1968), Australian novelist
Martin Hyland, British mathematician
Pat Hyland (disambiguation)
Robert Hyland (1920–1992), American radio station owner
Sabine Hyland (born 1964), American anthropologist
Sarah Hyland (born 1990), American actress
Thomas Hyland, blackjack player
William Hyland (disambiguation)

See also
 
 Hyland's, a brand of homeopathic products
 Hyland Hotel (disambiguation)
 Highland (disambiguation)

English-language surnames